The Bundesstraße 6n is a German federal road that runs east-west from the Vienenburg district of Goslar to Bernburg, where it connects to the A14. It was originally planned to be the A 36 motorway. 
It is intended to have four lanes running from the A 395 near Vienenburg through Wernigerode, Blankenburg, Quedlinburg, Aschersleben over the A 14 to Bernburg (Saale).

The designation B 6n has been given to distinguish it from the old B 6 and B 185 during the planning and construction phase. After it is opened to traffic and the old Bundesstraße is downgraded to a Landesstraße or Kreisstraßen the B 6n will be renumbered the B 6 from Goslar to Aschersleben, the remaining section to the A 14 will become the B 185. For the most part the signs have already been changed accordingly.

Route 
The B 6n is signed off the A 14 (Magdeburg–Halle/Leipzig) motorway at Bernburg motorway junction and, after Braunschweig (Brunswick), it joins the A 395 at the Vienenburg three-way interchange (Autobahndreieck). It is thus intended to link these two motorways and create a new east–west axis. It is also intended to relieve traffic on the A 2 by providing an alternative route. The B 6 is being downgraded; indeed it already has been in those sections where the B 6n has already been built and is no longer signed as a Bundesstraße or federal road.

From Vienenburg the B 6 continues as a 4-lane dual carriageway or Schnellstraße to Goslar and from there as the  B 82, albeit no longer a Schnellstraße, to the A 7 motorway near Rhüden. During ultrasound testing on the route of the B 6n numerous sites of archaeological significance were found, including a burial hut (Totenhütte ) of the Bernburg culture near Benzingerode in the borough of Wernigerode.

The section between the three-way intersection at Vienenburg and Bernburg is already finished. This has relieved through traffic in the towns and villages by providing a motorway-like Schnellstraße or so-called "yellow motorway" (gelbe Autobahn).

The extension of the B 6n is in planning and will consist of a ring road around Bernburg. In addition, there are preliminary investigations into an extension of the B 6 as far as the A 9 motorway. The route is intended to pass south of Köthen. The regional planning procedure for this was completed in 2001. The link to the A9 will be built near Thurland (about 5 kilometres south of the Dessau-Süd junction). There were thoughts about a further extension to Cottbus, but these have been put aside, because it was assessed that this route would not be used by a lot of traffic.

At present the B 6n is open from the west i.e. Goslar as far as the Bernburg junction.

Since 11 July 2007, planning and building law applies to all 13 sections (as far as the A 14).

However, complaints were made to the Federal Administrative Court against the planning decision for section 13.3 (between Ilberstedt and the A 14). This legal dispute ended on 5 November 2008 with a court-proposed settlement agreement.

According to the court decision, all applications for the B 6n gained governmental approval, which meant that the B 6n could be completed in the direction of the A 14 and lengthened as far as Bernburg.
This last section was opened to traffic on 11 December 2011.

Administrative regions 
The B 6n passes through the following administrative regions:
 Lower Saxony
 Goslar district
 Vienenburg
 Saxony-Anhalt
 Harz district
 Verwaltungsgemeinschaft Nordharz: Abbenrode, Stapelburg
 Ilsenburg
 Wernigerode
 Verwaltungsgemeinschaft Blankenburg: Heimburg, Blankenburg
 Verwaltungsgemeinschaft Thale: Thale, Westerhausen
 Quedlinburg
 Salzlandkreis
 Seeland
 Aschersleben
 Verwaltungsgemeinschaft Saale-Wipper: Güsten, Ilberstedt
 Verwaltungsgemeinschaft Bernburg: Bernburg (Saale)

See also 
 List of federal roads in Germany
 Bundesstraße 6

References

External links 
 B6n-online

006n
Transport in the Harz
Roads in Saxony-Anhalt